Herz Glacier is a glacier flowing southeast from the vicinity of Mount Paterson to the east coast of South Georgia. It was named by the Second German Antarctic Expedition under Wilhelm Filchner, 1911–12.

See also
 List of glaciers in the Antarctic
 Glaciology

References

Glaciers of South Georgia